The 1996 Missouri gubernatorial election was held on November 5, 1996 and resulted in a victory for the Democratic nominee, incumbent Governor Mel Carnahan, over the Republican candidate, State Auditor Margaret B. Kelly, and Libertarian J. Mark Oglesby.

Governor Carnahan died in a plane crash on October 16, 2000, near the end of this term, and was replaced by Lt. Governor Roger B. Wilson.

Results

References

 

Gubernatorial
1996
Missouri